Moorslede is a municipality located in the Belgian province of West Flanders. The municipality comprises the towns of Dadizele, Slypskapelle and Moorslede proper. On 1 January 2006, Moorslede had a total population of 10,618. The total area is 35.34 km² which gives a population density of 300 inhabitants per km².

History
Moorslede was home to the 1950 UCI World Championships, won by Briek Schotte.

Notable inhabitants
 Constant Lievens (1856-1893), the apostle of the Chota Nagpur, was born in Moorslede.
 Emiel Jacques :nl:Emiel Jacques (Moorslede 1874 - Michigan, 1937) was a Flemish painter, illustrator and professor, best known for his flax paintings.
 Camille Cools (1874, Moorslede - 1916, Detroit, USA) was the founder, editor and publisher of the Gazette van Detroit.

References

External links 

Municipalities of West Flanders